Escuminac (2011 population: 212) is a rural community in Northumberland County, New Brunswick, Canada. The local service district of Escuminac takes its name from the community.

Located on the south shore of Miramichi Bay, the community is several kilometres west of Point Escuminac, the southeastern limit of the bay.  Canada's largest inshore fishing vessel harbour is home to the local fishing fleet. Industries include two fish processing & freezing plants and a boat building facility.  One of Canada's important herring spawning grounds is located beside Point Escuminac.

According to Joseph-Étienne Guinard, a missionary and Cree language specialist with some experience with the Mi'kmaq, the word means "here are small fruits".  This perfectly describes the area as berries proliferate en masse in this low-lying flat area, and the first colonist were amazed at the amount of Ericaceae.

Peat bogs and rare peat cliffs are situated in the vicinity of Point Escuminac, approximately 5 kilometers east of the village.

History

Escuminac was originally an Irish and English settlement of six families, but outward emigration and the prevalence of French speakers in the immediate area has changed its composition somewhat.  A small two-room English school was closed in 1979.

Escuminac and surrounding fishing villages, especially Baie Ste. Anne, Hardwicke and Bay du Vin were the site of a tragedy on June 19 and June 20, 1959, when a sudden storm caused a loss of 35 fishermen of the area. It is called the Escuminac Disaster. A monument by Claude Rousselle commemorating the tragedy sits at the head of the harbour.

Notable people

See also
List of communities in New Brunswick

References

Communities in Northumberland County, New Brunswick
Designated places in New Brunswick
Local service districts of Northumberland County, New Brunswick